Gracey is an unincorporated community and census-designated place in Christian County, Kentucky, United States. As of the 2010 census it had a population of 138.

History
Gracey had its start when the railroad was extended to that point. The town was laid out in 1887, and named in honor of Frank P. Gracey, a railroad official. A post office was established at Gracey in 1887.

Geography
U.S. Route 68/Kentucky Route 80 bypasses the community to the north, while its old alignment, now known as Tobacco Road, runs along the southern edge.

Demographics

References

Census-designated places in Kentucky
Census-designated places in Christian County, Kentucky